Kadhalan is the soundtrack to the 1994 Tamil film of the same name, directed by Shankar. The soundtrack, features 9 songs composed by A. R. Rahman and lyrics penned by  Vaali, Vairamuthu, Shankar and Thirikudarasappa Kavirayar. The Choreographers were Sundaram – Mugur Sundar and Raju Sundaram. The Hindi version, Humse Hai Muqabala, sold  soundtrack album units in India. Shankar came to Vaali for one song, as there was a sentiment established that the movie will become hit if Vaali penned just one song for that movie (for e.g., Chikku bukku Rayilu for Shankar's previous directorial venture, Gentleman). Vaali generously accepted Shankar's request and penned Muqabla song which became a chartbuster.

Development 
During the recording of the song "Mukkabla", Rahman wanted Mano's voice to sound like R. D. Burman's as a means to distance him from S. P. Balasubrahmanyam, to who he was frequently compared.

Reception 

This soundtrack earned A. R. Rahman national acclaim. New styles were experimented with, as in the song "Pettai Rap", a Madras bashai song which was written in a rap-like style, interspersing Tamil with English words. Owing to the success and immense national popularity of the song "Mukkabla", the soundtrack was subsequently dubbed in Hindi as Humse Hai Muqabala and in Telugu as Premikudu. Lyrics for this versions were written by P. K. Mishra and Rajasri respectively. The Hindi version of the soundtrack, Humse Hai Muqabala, sold 2.5 million units in India.

The soundtrack earned Rahman his consecutive third Filmfare Best Music Director Award. P. Unnikrishnan got the break as a playback singer through this film. His rendition of the romantic song Ennavale Adi Ennavale won him the National Film Award for Best Male Playback Singer.

Track listing

Original Tamil version (Kadhalan)

Hindi version (Humse Hai Muqabala)

Telugu version (Premikudu)

Popular culture 
In 2014, the song "Urvasi" inspired the song "It's My Birthday" by American rapper will.i.am. In 2016, the song was featured in the film Lion.  It was later recreated by Yo Yo Honey Singh.  In 2019, the song "Mukkabla" was subsequently remade by Tanishk Bagchi in Hindi for the film Street Dancer 3D.

References

External links 
 Listen to Kadhalan songs online

A. R. Rahman soundtracks
Tamil film soundtracks
Hindi film soundtracks
1994 soundtrack albums